The Upsala Glacier is a large valley glacier on the eastern side of the Southern Patagonian Ice Field. Its higher portion lies in a disputed territory between Chile and Argentina. While the glacier flows from north to south it has three lesser eastflowing tributary glacier: Bertacchi, Cono and Murallón.

The glacier terminus is at Upsala channel of Lago Argentino. The Upsala Glacier is well known for its rapid retreat, which Greenpeace cites as evidence for global warming. Its retreat has been ongoing since the glacier was first documented in 1810.

The name comes from the old spelling with one p of Uppsala University, which sponsored the first glaciological studies in the area. The university is located in Uppsala, Sweden.

The glacier showed almost continual recession up until 1999. The acceleration in ice motion during the two decades preceding 1999 may have been augmented by the release of backstress when the glacier retreated beyond the islands in Brazo Upsala. In 2008, another period of even faster retreat started, reported as being about 10 times faster than the period recorded in the eight years prior.

As of 2018 Upsala Glacier has retreated to such degree that it no longer constrain its tributary Bertacchi Glacier. Likely this makes Bertacchi Glacier have higher flow rates reflected with a subsequent stretching and thinning out of parts of the glacier as well. At parts the velocity of flow is also thought to have increased in Bertacchi Glacier as result of the near-separation from Upsala Glacier.

See also
List of glaciers
Retreat of glaciers since 1850

External links
Greenpeace campaign film showing the retreat since 1928.
NASA article on the features of the Upsala Glacier.

References

Glaciers of Chile
Landforms of Santa Cruz Province, Argentina
Glaciers of Argentina
Glaciers of Magallanes Region